Stelis tricardium is a species of orchid native to Ecuador.

References

tricardium